Mary Arrigan (born 15 February 1943) is an Irish illustrator, artist and novelist, focusing on children's books.

Life 
Arrigan was born Mary Nolan in Newbridge, County Kildare on 5 February 1943 to Brendan Nolan and Marian Maher. She had one brother who went on to become a doctor. She got her education initially in Holy Family Convent, Co Kildare before going on to the National College in Dublin and University College Dublin. She married Emmet Arrigan in 1968 and they had three children. Arrigan worked as a secondary school art teacher. She exhibited as an artist for eighteen years. Arrigan began writing short stories for magazines and radio which lead to her writing full-time by 1994. Arrigan writes in both English and Irish. Her books have been translated into 10 languages.

Awards
 The Sunday Times CWA Award, 1991
 The Hennessy Award, 1993 
 International White Ravens Award, 1997
 Bisto Merit Award, 2000

Bibliography

 Grimstone's Ghost
 Ghost Bird
 Milo and One Dead Angry Druid
 Milo and The Raging Chieftains
 Milo and the Pirate Sisters
 Milo and the Long Lost Warriors
 Esty's Gold
 The Rabbit Girl
 Seascape with Barber's Harp
 The Dwellers Beneath
 Baldur's Bones
 Hard Luck
 Chocolate Moon
 Dead Monks and Shady Deals
 Landscape with Cracked Sheep
 Larkspur and the Grand March
 Saving the Dark Planet
 Maeve and the Long Arm Folly
 Maeve and the Goodnight Trail
 The Spirits of the Bog
 The Spirits of the Attic
 Pa Jinglebob: The Fastest Knitter in the West
 Pa Jinglebob and the Grabble Gang
 Mario's Angels: A Story about the Artist Giotto
 Lá le mamó
 Mamó cois trá 
 Mamó ar an Fheirm
 Mamó ag an sorcas
 An Scath Baisti
 Mac Dathó agus a chú
 Mamó ag an zú

External links 
 Mary Arrigan Penguin Bio

References and sources

1943 births
Living people
Irish children's book illustrators
Irish children's writers
Irish women children's writers
Irish women illustrators
21st-century Irish women writers
20th-century Irish women writers
21st-century Irish women artists
20th-century Irish women artists